Marika is a 1938 Hungarian comedy drama film directed by Viktor Gertler and starring Pál Jávor, Lia Szepes and Zita Perczel. The film is based on a play by István Zágon, which was later adapted as the German film Marili. The sets were designed by Márton Vincze. After his wife dies, Orbán Sándor adopts his stepdaughter Marika. However, once she grows into a woman she falls in love with him.

Cast
 Pál Jávor as Orbán Sándor  
 Lia Szepes as Marika  
 Zita Perczel as Ella  
 József Juhász as Karády  
 Lidia Beöthy as Ella barátnõje  
 Zoltán Hosszú as János, komornyik  
 Béla Mihályffi as Színházigazgató  
 Ferenc Pethes as Tóni  
 Lajos Köpeczi Boócz as Kerényi, színiigazgató 
 István Falussy as Színész  
 Gusztáv Harasztos as Színházi szakember  
 Rezsö Harsányi as Gróf Kápolnay 
 Valéria Hidvéghy as Szobalány  
 Aladár Sarkadi 
 Irén Sitkey as Nusi, cukrászdáslány 
 Sándor Solymossy as Súgó  
 Lajos Ujváry as Színész  
 Anna Zöldhelyi as Kerényiné, Julia

External links 

1938 films
Hungarian comedy-drama films
1938 comedy-drama films
1930s Hungarian-language films
Films directed by Viktor Gertler
Hungarian films based on plays
Hungarian black-and-white films